"It Ain't Easy Bein' Easy" is a song written by Mark Gray, Les Taylor and Shawna Harrington-Burkhart, and recorded by American country music artist Janie Fricke.  It was released in August 1982 as the first single from the album It Ain't Easy.  The song was Fricke's second number one on the country chart as a solo artist.  The single went to number one for one week and spent a total of thirteen weeks on the country chart.

Charts

References

1982 songs
Janie Fricke songs
1982 singles
Songs written by Mark Gray (singer)
Song recordings produced by Bob Montgomery (songwriter)
Columbia Records singles